Soloniaina is a Madagascan surname. Notable people with this surname include:

 Jean de Dieu Soloniaina (born 1974), Madagascan boxer
 Josiane Soloniaina (born 1978), Madagascan wrestler

Malagasy-language surnames